This is the progression of world record improvements of the Mile M80 division of Masters athletics.

Key

References

Masters athletics world record progressions